Theofanis 'Fanis' Tzandaris (born 13 June 1993) is a Greek professional footballer who plays as a midfielder for Super League club Lamia.

Career
On April 3, 2015, along with Giorgos Katsikas, he terminated his contract with PAOK, receiving his payment until the end of the season.

On 2 July 2015, Tzandaris signed a four-year contract with Greek champions Olympiacos, whose latest intention is to invest in young Greek prospects that will develop into the team's core. Aiming towards this direction, the Greek club also signed Stefanos Kapino, Dimitris Goutas, Dimitris Kolovos and Giannis Gianniotas, adding to the club's existing talent as the likes of Kostas Fortounis, Andreas Bouchalakis, Tasos Avlonitis and Andreas Gianniotis among others.

On 19 January 2016, he joined Panionios on loan for six months, since he did not manage to earn a single appearance for Olympiacos in the Superleague Greece. On 23 January 2016, almost six months after his last appearance in the Super League, he made his debut with Panionios in a 0–0 home draw game against Asteras Tripoli as a substitute.

On 6 February 2017, he joined Slovenian club Koper on a one-and-a-half year loan, until the summer of 2018.

On 24 June 2017, he terminated his contract with Olympiacos. On 21 August 2017, he signed a three-year contract with Panathinaikos as a personal choice of club's coach Marinos Ouzounidis. On 17 December 2017, he made his debut with the club in an away game against Xanthi.
On 20 November 2019, he mutually terminated his contract with the club as he was not in the plans of Panathinaikos coach Giorgos Donis.

References

External links

1993 births
Living people
Footballers from Thessaloniki
Greek footballers
Greek expatriate footballers
Association football midfielders
PAOK FC players
Apollon Pontou FC players
Olympiacos F.C. players
Panionios F.C. players
FC Koper players
Panathinaikos F.C. players
FC Spartak Trnava players
PAS Lamia 1964 players
Super League Greece players
Slovenian PrvaLiga players
Slovak Super Liga players
Greek expatriate sportspeople in Slovenia
Greek expatriate sportspeople in Slovakia
Expatriate footballers in Slovenia
Expatriate footballers in Slovakia